The discography of Imelda May, an Irish rockabilly musician and singer-songwriter, comprises six studio albums, ten singles and several music videos.

Albums

Studio albums

Singles

Notes

References

External links
Official website

Discographies of Irish artists